The 33rd National Film Awards, presented by Ministry of Information, Bangladesh to felicitate the best of Bangladeshi Cinema released in the year 2008. The government announced the names of 24 artistes in 23 categories for the National Film Award in recognition of their outstanding contributions to the country's film industry. An eleven-member Jury Board prepared a list of 15 films that could be awarded out of 17 films on January 4, 2010.

List of winners

A Total of 24 awards were given in this year.

Merit Awards

Technical Awards

Special Awards
 Best Child Artist (Special) - Mrida Wafsar Nawar Wafa (Amar Ache Jol)

See also
Bachsas Film Awards
Meril Prothom Alo Awards
Ifad Film Club Award
Babisas Award

References

External links

National Film Awards (Bangladesh) ceremonies
2008 film awards
2010 awards in Bangladesh
2010 in Dhaka
February 2010 events in Bangladesh